Marjaneh Golchin (born February 21, 1969) is an Iranian actress. She started her career in television and starred in season 1 of “Mirror” directed by Gholamhussein Lotfi in 1985. She is best known for appearances in Shabash by Hamed Kolahdari and in series such as King of Ear by Davood Mirbagheri, Bezangah by Reza Attaran, 3 Dong 3 Dong by Shahed Ahmadlou and Armando directed by Ehsan Abdipoor.

See also 
 Iranian women
 Iranian cinema
 Fajr International Film Festival

References

External links
 
 

Iranian actresses
1969 births
Living people
Iranian film actresses